Papyrus 95 (in the Gregory-Aland numbering), designated by siglum 𝔓95, is an early copy of the New Testament in Greek. It is a papyrus manuscript of the Gospel of John. The surviving texts of John are verses 5:26-29,36-38. The manuscript palaeographically has been assigned to the early 3rd century.

The writing is in 35 lines per page.

Text 
The Greek text of this manuscript is a representative of the Alexandrian text-type, Comfort ascribed it as proto-Alexandrian, though the extant portion is too fragmentary for certainty. It has not yet been placed in any of the Categories of New Testament manuscripts.

 Location
The manuscript is currently housed at the Biblioteca Medicea Laurenziana (PL II/31) at Florence.

Textual variants 
 5:27 Word-spacing analysis indicates that 10-14 letters intruded between the first two words of the verse
 5:28: ακουσουσιν (shall hear (future tense)) becomes ακουσαντες (have heard (aorist tense, participle)).
 5:36: omits second αυτα (these) through possible homoeoteleuton.

Nomina Sacra 
The fragment should have the word πατήρ contracted (nomina sacra) in two places, but instead, lacuane.

See also 

 List of New Testament papyri

References

Image

Further reading 

 Jean Lenaerts, Un papyrus de l’Évangile de Jean : PL II/31, Chronique d’ Egypte 60 (Brussels: 1985), pp. 117–120.
 

New Testament papyri
3rd-century biblical manuscripts
Early Greek manuscripts of the New Testament
Gospel of John papyri